Ray Martini (born 14 July 1930) is a former Australian rules footballer who played with Carlton and Essendon in the Victorian Football League (VFL).

Family
Although there are suggestions that this "Martini" is the son of the former Geelong footballer, Percy Martini, the fact that Percy Martin's wife, May Victoria Martin (1887–1928), née Machar, died some two years before Ray Martini's birth, and that there's no record of Percy Martin ever remarrying (or, in contrast, being the father of an extra-marital child) seems to indicate that there's no substance to these claims.

Football

Williamstown (VFA)
He played with Williamstown for two seasons: 1954 and 1955 totalling 10 senior games and kicking 6 goals.

Notes

References
  Holmesby, Russell & Main, Jim (2009), The Encyclopedia of AFL Footballers: every AFL/VFL player since 1897 (8th ed.), Seaford, Victoria: BAS Publishing. 
 Maplestone, M., Flying Higher: History of the Essendon Football Club 1872–1996, Essendon Football Club, (Melbourne), 1996. 
 Premiers tune up for League opening, The Age, (Saturday, 8 April 1926), p.26.

External links 
 
 
 Ray Martini's playing statistics from The VFA Project
 Ray Martini's profile at Blueseum

1930 births
Essendon Football Club players
Carlton Football Club players
Williamstown Football Club players
Living people
Australian rules footballers from Victoria (Australia)